Míse are a London-based traditional Irish music band, composed of six young musicians, and featuring a wide range of instruments.  In 2002, they were finalists for the prestigious BBC Radio 2 Young Folk Award.  The group were formed in County Kerry, Ireland.

Band members 

Liam O'sullivan - Accordion

Matt Griffin - Banjo, Mandolin, Guitar, Whistles

Tim Dowd - Uilleann Pipes, Flute, Whistles

Daniel Griffin - Bodhrán

Liam Stapleton - Flute, Whistles

Anthony Davis - Keyboards

Debut album 

Míse released their debut album Firefly to critical acclaim.

Track Listing:

1.  Hooves In The Rock

2.  Missing Key

3.  Chonaiomar

4.  Herschel

5.  Firefly

6.  Spanish Point

7.  One. Two.. Three

8.  Busker's Waltz

9.  Wee Duck

10. Wibblies

11. Tico Tico

12. Classical

13. That's Stuff

External links
Official website archived at the Internet Archive

Celtic music groups